The Southern Rhodesia sweepstakes referendum of February 1934 saw the voters of Southern Rhodesia vote to permit the running of sweepstakes gambling "under strict legislative control", managed by the government of the colony.

Background
The Lotteries Prohibition Act 1891 made lotteries illegal in Southern Rhodesia, but it became increasingly common for Rhodesians to participate in sweepstakes conducted outside the colony and it was felt among the political class that a measure of reform on the issue was overdue. The case for legalising sweepstakes had been raised in the Southern Rhodesia Assembly from 1928, and in the general election of 1933 the Reform Party stated in its manifesto that it would submit the issue to a referendum should it be elected.

Arrangements
No specific act was passed to authorise the referendum; instead the Government Statistician was instructed to conduct the ballot, which was conducted entirely through postal voting with no polling stations being open. All those registered to vote were sent a ballot paper at the beginning of February, with a calendar month to respond (the ballot closed on 28 February). There were two separate issues on the ballot paper, which read:

1. Are you in favour of sweepstakes under strict legislative control being permitted to operate in Southern Rhodesia?

2. If sweepstakes be legalised, are you in favour of –

(a) Management by the Government direct?

or

(b) Management by a special authority under Government licence?

Results
There were 28,216 ballot papers dispatched, of which 20,550 were returned, making a turnout of 72.8%. The majority in favour of legalising sweepstakes was an overwhelming one of more than four to one. The voters then approved management by the Government direct, by a slightly more than two-thirds majority, although the Statistician discounted some 1,036 votes on the second question who had given contradictory answers "which made it impossible to determine what their views on management were". 203 ballot papers were blank on the second question.

Following the result of the referendum, the House of Assembly passed the State Lotteries Act on 14 May 1935 which legalised sweepstakes under Government control.

Question 1

Question 2

References
 Source Book of Parliamentary Elections and Referenda in Southern Rhodesia 1898–1962 ed. by F.M.G. Willson (Department of Government, University College of Rhodesia and Nyasaland, Salisbury 1963)

1934 referendums
1934 sweepstakes referendum
Sweepstakes referendum
1934 elections in Africa
Referendums in Zimbabwe